was an Empress consort of Japan. She was the consort of Emperor En'yū of Japan.

She was the daughter of regent Fujiwara no Kanemichi.  She was placed in the Imperial harem to benefit her father in his rivalry with his brother Fujiwara no Kaneie by giving birth to an heir.  She did not give birth to a Crown Prince and was replaced as an Empress by the daughter of her father's cousin and designated successor as regent, Fujiwara no Yoritada.

Notes

Fujiwara clan
Japanese empresses
947 births
979 deaths